Sherpur district (Sherpur Jela also Sherpur Zila) is a district in Northern Bangladesh. It is a part of Mymensingh Division. Sherpur district was a sub-division of Jamalpur District before 1984. It was upgraded to a district on February 22, 1984.

Etymology 
The name "Sherpur" can't be found in ancient history. During the rules of emperor Akbar, this area was called "Dash Kahonia Baju". The previous name of Brahmaputra river in this area was "Louhitto Sagar" which was situated in a vast area from the south border of Sherpur municipality to Jamalpur Ghat. The people of this area had to pay 10 kahon coins to the leaseholders as an annual tax for travelling in the river. "Dash" means ten and "Kahon" is a unit of measure for counting which means 128 pieces. From this event, this area was called as "Dash Kahonia".

During the Nawabi period in Bangla, the last landlord of Gazi clan, Sher Ali Gazi occupied and reigned this area independently. From then, the name of this area was changed from "Dash Kahonia" to Sherpur according to the name of the ruler, Sher Ali Gazi.

History 

Sherpur region was a part of the kingdom of the Kamarupa in the ancient time and eventually became part of the Mughal Empire's Bengal Subah. Fakir-Sannyasi Revolts were held against the East India Company and the local zamindars from the time of Warren Hastings to Lord Cornwallis. Tipu Shah, leader of the Fakir Movement, declared sovereignty in the area and established his capital at Gajripa. Peasant conferences were held in 1906, 1914 and 1917 at Kamarer Char of Sherpur under the leadership of Khos Muhammad Chowdhury. The communists revolted against the systems of Nankar, Tonk, Bhawali, Mahajani, Ijaradari during 1838–48 in Sherpur. In 1897 a devastating earthquake changed the main flow of the Brahmaputra to go to the Jamuna and severely reduced the flow in the Old Brahmaputra. It also caused serious damage to many old buildings.

During the non-cooperation movement in 1970 declared by Sheikh Mujibur Rahman, a war committee was formed in this district. Sherpur played an important role by training the freedom fighters led by the war committee.

Geography 
Sherpur district covers a area of 1359.87 sq km, located in between 24°18' and 25°18' north latitudes and in between 89°53' and 90°91' east longitudes. 

It is bounded on the north by India, on the east by Mymensingh district, on the south and west by Jamalpur district. The main rivers of Sherpur district are Bramhaputra, Kongsho and Vogai. Malijhi, Shomeshwari, Nitai, Maharoshi are some minor rivers of this district. Ceramic soil is the main natural resource of this district. The annual average temperature of this district varies from maximum 33.3 °C to minimum 12 °C.The annual rainfall is 2174 mm.

Administration 
 Deputy Commissioner (DC): Sahela Akter
Administrator of Zila Porishod: Md.Humayun Kabir Ruman 
 Mayor of Sherpur Municipality: Golam Kibriya Liton

The district consists of 5 upazilas (sub-district), 52 unions, 458 mauzas, 695 villages, 4 municipalities, 36 wards and 99 mahallas. The upazilas are:

Demographics 

According to the 2011 Bangladesh census, Sherpur District had a population of 1,358,325, of which 676,388 were males and 681,937 females. Rural population was 1,170,219 (86.15%) while the urban population was 188,106 (13.85%). Sherpur District had a literacy rate of 37.91% for the population 7 years and above: 40.17% for males and 35.70% for females.

Muslims are the largest population with 96.70%, while Hindus are the largest minority with 2.57%. There is a small minority of Christians, mostly Garo. 16,231 are from ethnic minorities, mainly Garo.

Education 
The literacy rate of this district is 62.1% The number of educational institutions of this district are Government college 3, non-government college 16, government high school 3, non-government high school 146, junior high school 27, government primary school 358, non-government primary school l46, madrasah 292, agricultural training institute 1, nursing training institute 1, vocational training institute 1.

Health 

The numbers of health centers of this district are district sadar hospital 1, upazila health complex 5, health and family planning centre 52, diabetic centre 1, maternity and child welfare centre 1, tuberculosis satellite centre 1, leprosy satellite centre 1, mission hospital 1, Gana sastha centre 2, safe community programme 1, satellite clinic 17, TB clinic 1, non-government clinic 2.

Economy 
The economy of Sherpur is mainly agricultural and trading based, although non-farm economic activities performing a substantial share in the development oriented program of the district. Majority of the population are traders and farmers. Out of total 335,460 holdings of the district, 60.12% holdings are farms that produce varieties of crops namely local and HYV rice, wheat, jute, mustard, potato, pulses, different kinds of vegetables, tobacco and others. They are also involved in trading and other business activities. Various fruits like banana, mango, black berry, coconut, betel nut, date, jackfruit, palm, jambura, bel, papaya, boroi, Monkey fruit, ataphal, salita etc. are grown. Fish of different varieties are abound in this district and as in other parts of the country. Varieties of fish are caught from rivers, tributary channels and creeks. The popular fresh water fishes comprise ruhi, catla, mrigel, kalbaus, chital, boal, airh, pangas, gazar, shoul, pabda, koi, shing, phali, bele, tengra etc. Besides, newly introduced exotic varieties of fishers are tilapia, nilotica, silver carp, grass carp etc. Besides crops, livestock and fishery are the main source of household income. Non-agricultural activities also play an important role in the economy of the district.

Media
SherpurTimes, Weekly Sherpur, Sherpur News24, Weekly Dashkahania, Weekly Chalti Khabar, Sahityaloka, Barshati, Ra, etc.; extinct: Biddaunnati Sadhini (1865), Weekly Biggapani (1865), Weekly Charybarta (1881), Bangasuridh (1881), Samskriti Sanjibini, fortnightly Kishore (1957–58), Monthly Daxina (1967), Sherpur Pratidin, Shamol Bangla etc.

Cultural organizations 
The number of cultural organizations of this district are club 93, public library 4, drama stage 3, theatre group 15, literary society 5, women's organisation 30, cinema hall 13, a Shilpakala academy and a shishu academy.

Points of interest 
Archaeological Heritage and Relics include: Gojni Obokash Kendra, Madhutila Ecopark in Nalitabari, Ghagra Laskar Bari Mosque (1808), Baraduari Mosque at Garhjaripar, Garh Jaripar Fort (1486-91AD), Tomb of Darvish Jarip Shah, Tomb of Shah Kamal (1644 AD), Tomb of Sher Ali Gazi, Mughal Mosque at Kasba, Maisaheba Mosque, and Residences of Nay Ani, Arai Ani and Pouney Tin Ani Zamindars.

Member of the 11th parliament

See also
Tourist Spots in Sherpur
Districts of Bangladesh
History of Mymensingh

Notes

References

 
Districts of Bangladesh
Districts of Mymensingh Division